Robert Fredrik Nordén (27 September 1926 – 29 July 1998) was a Norwegian economist, civil servant and politician for the Labour Party. He was the director of the Norwegian State Railways from 1978 to 1988.

He was born in Oslo, and was a cand.oecon. by education. He was appointed state secretary in the Ministry of Transport and Communications on 15 August 1960 as a part of the Gerhardsen's Third Cabinet. On 6 January 1961 he left office and was hired as deputy under-secretary of state, an administrative position in the department.

In 1969 he was appointed director in the Norwegian State Railways, and in 1978 he became director-general. He left in 1987, and Tore Lindholt became acting director-general. Nordén worked as an advisor in the Ministry of Petroleum and Energy from 1988 to 1992.

References

1926 births
1998 deaths
Norwegian state secretaries
Labour Party (Norway) politicians
Directors of government agencies of Norway
Norwegian State Railways (1883–1996) people
20th-century  Norwegian economists